Christian II of Saxony (23 September 1583 – 23 June 1611) was Elector of Saxony from 1591 to 1611.

He was born in Dresden, the eldest son of Christian I of Saxony and Sophie of Brandenburg. He belonged to the Albertine line of the House of Wettin.

Christian succeeded his father as Elector of Saxony in 1591 at the age of eight. Because of his youth, his mother Sophie of Brandenburg and his kinsman, Duke Frederick William I of Saxe-Weimar, assumed the regency of the Electorate until 1601, when Christian was declared an adult and began to govern.

In the course of the event that eventually led to the Thirty Years' War, his refusal to join the Union of Auhausen deepened the division between the Protestant German states.

In Dresden, on September 12, 1602, Christian married Hedwig, daughter of the King Frederick II of Denmark. This marriage was childless. He died in Dresden in 1611.

Having left no issue, on his death his brother John George succeeded him as Elector.

Ancestry

References

1583 births
1611 deaths
Nobility from Dresden
Prince-electors of Saxony
House of Wettin
Modern child monarchs
Albertine branch
Burials at Freiberg Cathedral